Srinath Vasishta is an Indian actor, writer, director, stand-up comedian and dubbing artist who appears mainly in Kannada language films and serials.

Filmography

Films

As an actor
 3 Gante 30 Dina 30 Second
 Bhagavadgita
 Bombeyata 
 Harakeya Kuri
 Kraurya
 Maha Edabidangi
 Mr.Mommaga 
 Naa Ninna Mareyalare
 RangiTaranga
 Ravana
 Shubra 
 Tapori

As a director
 Dr. Sukanya 
 Manthana  
 Salila 

As a dubbing artist
 Bachchan (2013 film) (for Nassar (actor))

Serials

As a writer
 Male Billu
 Mr Bhoopathi
 Mukta (TV series)
 Muthina Tene
 Paramapada
 Silli Lalli

As an actor
 Krishna Nee Begane Baaro

As a director
 Hasya Taranga
 Mussanje
 Nighuda
 Tirukana Kanasu

Literary works
 Vyūha (A detective drama)

Awards and honours
 Kempegowda Award

References

Kannada actors
Kannada film directors